The Umboi tube-nosed fruit bat (Nyctimene vizcaccia) is a species of megabat in the family Pteropodidae. It is found in Papua New Guinea and the Solomon Islands.

References

Nyctimene (genus)
Bats of Oceania
Mammals of Papua New Guinea
Mammals of the Solomon Islands
Mammals described in 1914
Taxonomy articles created by Polbot
Taxa named by Oldfield Thomas
Bats of New Guinea